General elections were held in Italy on 16 May 1880, with a second round of voting on 23 May.

Campaign
The Historical Left was led by the Prime Minister of Italy, Agostino Depretis, longtime Prime Minister of Italy.

The bloc of the Historical Right was led by Marco Minghetti, a conservative politician and former Prime Minister, from Bologna.

A third large parliamentary group was the Dissident Left, composed by former members of the Left, which were against the alliance with the Right. Also known as La Pentarchia (The Pentarchy), its main leader was Giuseppe Zanardelli, a jurisconsult from Brescia.

The Historical Left group emerged as the largest in Parliament, although left-wing dissidents won 119 of the 508 seats, becoming the third parliamentary group. Only 621,896 men of a total population of around 29 million were entitled to vote. Benedetto Cairoli was confirmed Prime Minister by the king Umberto I.

Parties and leaders

Results

References

General elections in Italy
Italy
General
Italy